Tree crickets are insects of the order Orthoptera. These crickets are in the subfamily Oecanthinae of the family Gryllidae.

Description
Tree crickets as well as most other crickets have two pairs of wings. The fore wings are located closer to the head and are hard and leathery in appearance. The hind wings are located aft of the fore wings and are the wings it uses for flight. When the cricket is not in flight the fore wings fold back to cover the hind wings. The bodies of tree crickets are long and skinny with a coloration that matches their habitat. They have large powerful legs used for jumping. Their heads contain two antennae which can sense both touch and odor and compound eyes which are inherent in all Orthoptera.

Distribution and habitat
They live in trees and shrubs, for which they are well camouflaged. These crickets are nocturnal and can be found on every continent except Antarctica.

In Europe, tree crickets have been expanding northwards and had reached the island of Jersey in the Channel Islands by 2010. In August 2015, the first population was found in mainland England at Dungeness in Kent, where hundreds of males were present.

Tribes and genera
Three tribes, containing about 25 genera, have been identified in the subfamily Oecanthinae:

Oecanthini
Auth.: Blanchard, 1845
 Oecanthodes Toms & Otte, 1988
 Oecanthus Serville, 1831
 Viphyus Otte, 1988

Paroecanthini 
Auth.: Gorochov, 1986 – Central & South America; Java
subtribe Paroecanthina Gorochov, 1986
 Angustitrella Gorochov, 2011
 Bofana Otte & Perez-Gelabert, 2009
 Ectotrypa Saussure, 1874
 Paroecanthus Saussure, 1859
 Perutrella Gorochov, 2011
 Selvagryllus Otte, 2006
 Siccotrella Gorochov, 2011
subtribe Tafaliscina Desutter-Grandcolas, 1988
 Adenophallusia de Mello & de Camargo e Mello, 1996
 Amblyrhethus Kirby, 1906
 Bezverkhovia Gorochov, 2018
 Brazitrypa Gorochov, 2011
 Cylindrogryllus Saussure, 1878
 Eubezverkhovia Gorochov & Izerskyy, 2020
 Mexitrypa Gorochov, 2011
 Prodiatrypa Desutter-Grandcolas, 1988
 Tafalisca Walker, 1869
 Veredatrypa Campos, 2020

Xabeini
Auth.: Vickery & Kevan, 1983
genus group Prognathogryllus Zimmerman, 1948
 Leptogryllus Perkins, 1899
 Prognathogryllus Zimmerman, 1948
 Thaumatogryllus Perkins, 1899
genus group Xabea Vickery & Kevan, 1983
 Neoxabea Kirby, 1906
 Xabea Vickery & Kevan, 1983

incertae sedis
 Paraphasius Chopard, 1927 - monotypic P. lepturoides Stenoecanthus Chopard, 1912

Communication
Like other species of cricket they produce their calling song by rubbing the ridges of their wings together. The chirp (or trill) of a tree cricket is long and continuous and can sometimes be mistaken for the call of a cicada or certain species of frogs. While male tree crickets have the ability to call, females lack the ability. This call is then received by other tree crickets in the area through a system called sender-receiver matching. For example, a male tree cricket will produce a mating call at a specific range of frequencies. This allows females to be able to pick out the males mating call without becoming distracted or confused by other calls from other species of insects. This range of frequencies is called a carrier frequency. Tree crickets are unique in the way they use carrier frequencies because the range of frequencies changes according to the temperature. Due to this, female tree crickets have tympanum (hearing organs) that can receive a much wider range of frequencies than most other insects. Female tree crickets seem to prefer calls at the lower range of frequencies indicating the presence of a large male. This preference for larger males could be because larger males produce a greater amount of sperm thus increasing the females chances of offspring. Some male tree crickets produce a sound that is too quiet to be audible; they amplify their mating call by making a "megaphone" type structure from tree leaves.

Diet
Tree crickets are omnivorous, and are known to feed on plant parts, other insects such as Sternorrhyncha, and even fungi.

Mating
Tree crickets exhibit a behavior called courtship feeding. Shortly after copulation the male tree cricket secretes a fluid from the metanotal gland located between its wings in the thoracic cavity. This fluid provides the female with nutrients that help to increase the chances of reproduction. Female tree crickets have even been known to steal this fluid from a mating pair during copulation or finish consuming the fluid if the first female dismounts and leaves. After mating a male cannot mate again until after 30 to 60 min allowing the production of another spermatophere. Eggs are laid in the fall, in a series of small holes drilled into the bark. After remaining dormant for the winter, the eggs hatch in the spring and the young tree crickets begin feeding on aphids. They may go through as many as twelve molts before reaching maturity around mid summer.

Cultural associations
The snowy tree cricket (Oecanthus fultoni'' is known for having a chirping rate highly correlated with ambient temperature. This relationship is known as Dolbear's Law.

References

External links